Kepler-69 (KOI-172, 2MASS J19330262+4452080, KIC 8692861) is a G-type main-sequence star similar to the Sun in the constellation Cygnus, located about  from Earth. On April 18, 2013 it was announced that the star has two planets. Although initial estimates indicated that the terrestrial planet Kepler-69c might be within the star's habitable zone, further analysis showed that the planet very likely is interior to the habitable zone and is far more analogous to Venus than to Earth and thus completely inhospitable.

Nomenclature and history
Prior to Kepler observation, Kepler-69 had the 2MASS catalogue number 2MASS J19330262+4452080. In the Kepler Input Catalog it has the designation of KIC 8692861, and when it was found to have transiting planet candidates it was given the Kepler object of interest number of KOI-172.
  
The star's planets were discovered by NASA's Kepler Mission, a mission tasked with discovering planets in transit around their stars. The transit method that Kepler uses involves detecting dips in brightness in stars. These dips in brightness can be interpreted as planets whose orbits move in front of their stars from the perspective of Earth. The name Kepler-69 derives directly from the fact that the star is the catalogued 69th star discovered by Kepler to have confirmed planets.
 
The designations b, c derive from the order of discovery. The designation of b is given to the first planet orbiting a given star, followed by the other lowercase letters of the alphabet. In the case of Kepler-69, all of the known planets in the system were discovered at one time, so b is applied to the closest planet to the star and c to the farthest.

Stellar characteristics
Kepler-69 is a G4 star that is approximately 81% the mass of and 93% the radius of the Sun. It has a surface temperature of 5638 ± 168 K and is 9.8 billion years old. In comparison, the Sun has a surface temperature of 5778 K and is 4.6 billion years old.

The star's apparent magnitude, or how bright it appears from Earth's perspective, is 13.7. Therefore, Kepler-69 is too dim to be seen with the naked eye.

Planetary system
Kepler-69 has two known planets orbiting around it. Kepler-69b is a hot super-Earth-sized exoplanet.  Kepler-69c is a super-Earth-sized exoplanet, about 70% larger than Earth. It receives a similar amount of flux from its star as Venus does from the Sun, and is thus a likely candidate for a super-Venus.

See also
 List of potentially habitable exoplanets

References

External links
 Kepler Mission – NASA.
 Kepler – Discoveries – Summary Table – NASA.
 Kepler – Discovery of New Planetary Systems (2013).
 Kepler – Tally of Planets/interactive (2013) – NYT.
 Video (02:27) - NASA Finds Three New Planets in "Habitable Zone" (04/18/2013).

G-type main-sequence stars
Planetary transit variables
Cygnus (constellation)
172
Planetary systems with two confirmed planets